Articulina is an extant suborder of bryozoans in the order Cyclostomatida.

Families in this suborder include:

Crisiidae
Crisuliporidae

References

Protostome suborders
Cyclostomatida
Extant Early Cretaceous first appearances